Rango is a 2011 American computer-animated Western comedy film directed by Gore Verbinski from a screenplay by John Logan. Co-produced by Verbinski with Graham King and John B. Carls, the film stars the voices of Johnny Depp, Isla Fisher, Abigail Breslin, Ned Beatty, Alfred Molina, Bill Nighy, Stephen Root, Harry Dean Stanton, Ray Winstone, and Timothy Olyphant. The film's plot centers on Rango (Depp), a chameleon who accidentally ends up in the town of Dirt, an outpost that is in desperate need of a new sheriff. Rango was produced by Nickelodeon Movies, Verbinski's Blind Wink Productions, and King's GK Films, and distributed by Paramount Pictures, with the animation provided by Industrial Light & Magic. 

Rango premiered at Westwood on February 14, 2011, and was released in the United States on March 4, 2011. The film was both a major critical and commercial success, grossing $245.7 million against a budget of $135 million. At the 84th Academy Awards, the film won Best Animated Feature, making it the first non-Disney or Pixar film to win since 2006's Happy Feet, and the last one to win until 2018's Spider-Man: Into the Spider-Verse.

Plot
A theatrically minded pet chameleon becomes stranded in the Mojave Desert after his terrarium accidentally falls out of his owners' car. Seeking shelter, he learns from a nine-banded armadillo named Roadkill, who is seeking the mystical "Spirit of the West", of an Old West desert town called "Dirt" where water comes in through a mysterious rite on Wednesdays. Seeing no other options, the chameleon heads out into the desert, where he narrowly avoids being eaten by a vicious red-tailed hawk before meeting Beans, a desert iguana farmer, who takes him to Dirt.

Asked about his identity, the chameleon presents himself to the townsfolk as a tough drifter named "Rango" and quickly runs afoul of Gila monster Bad Bill, who challenges him to a duel. The hawk interrupts the duel and chases Rango, who accidentally knocks over an empty water tower and crushes the hawk to death. Believing he did so intentionally, the townsfolk praise Rango, who is appointed as the new sheriff by Dirt's elderly desert tortoise mayor, Tortoise John. Meanwhile, the townsfolk worry that with the hawk dead, the infamous, hawk-fearing gunfighter Rattlesnake Jake (who murdered the previous sheriff) will return.

Beans explains to Rango that Dirt is in the midst of a drought, and that its only water supply, stored in a water cooler jug at the town bank, is nearly empty. She demands Rango investigate where the water has gone and in doing so, he inadvertently helps a gang of bank robbers, led by a mole named Balthazar, to steal the water supply. Rango organizes a posse that finds the banker, Johannes Merrimack III, dead in the middle of the desert from drowning. The posse tracks the robbers to their hideout, where they fight Balthazar's bat-riding clan over the stolen water bottle before discovering it to be empty. The robbers profess that they found it empty, but the posse still takes them into custody.

After being questioned by Rango about his buying of the land around Dirt, John brings in Rattlesnake Jake, who runs Rango out of town after forcing him to admit his lies to the townsfolk. Dejected, Rango returns to the highway, where he passes out while trying to cross to the other side. He tells his story to the Spirit of the West, an elderly Man with No Name, who advises he go back to Dirt and set things right, telling him that "No man can walk out on his own story". With the aid of Roadkill and mystical moving yuccas, Rango discovers an emergency shut-off valve in a water pipeline to Las Vegas, Nevada, which John has been manipulating to cause the water shortage so he could buy the land for himself.

Rango returns to Dirt and challenges Jake to a duel, a diversion to allow the yuccas to restore the town's water and allow Rango to make his resolve clear to Jake. However, John and his men force Rango to surrender by threatening Beans' life before attempting to drown the duo inside the bank's vault. John then tries to shoot Jake with Rango's gun, but finds Rango has taken its only bullet, which he uses to shatter the vault's glass door, freeing himself and Beans. Impressed, Jake salutes Rango for proving his heroism before carrying John off into the desert. The citizens of Dirt celebrate the return of their water supply, and Rango, now a true hero, becomes their new leader.

Voice cast
 Johnny Depp as Rango, an eccentric but intelligent and heroic chameleon. His actual name is unknown, but he calls himself Rango throughout the film. Johnny Depp also voiced Lars and Raoul Duke in a cameo appearance, reprising his role from the 1998 film Fear and Loathing in Las Vegas.
 Isla Fisher as Beans, a hotheaded but good-hearted desert iguana and Rango's love interest. 
 Abigail Breslin as Priscilla, a young and sweet-natured cactus mouse.
 Ned Beatty as Tortoise John, an elderly and calculating desert tortoise who is the mayor of Dirt.
 Alfred Molina as Roadkill, an elderly nine-banded armadillo.
 Bill Nighy as Rattlesnake Jake, a deadly and sadistic western diamondback rattlesnake gunslinger.
 Harry Dean Stanton as Balthazar Douglas Peterson, an elderly mole farmer.
 Ray Winstone as Bad Bill, a Gila monster outlaw who serves as the brutish enforcer  of the mayor.
 Timothy Olyphant as the Spirit of the West, an elderly Man with No Name. The likeness of Clint Eastwood is used to represent his character.
 Stephen Root as Doc Kenny, a jackrabbit who is Dirt's local doctor, Johannes Merrimack III, a ground squirrel who is a banker at Dirt's local bank, and Mr. Snuggles, a porcupine.
 Maile Flanagan as Lucky
 Alanna Ubach as Boo, Cletus, a raccoon; Fresca, and Miss Daisy
 Ian Abercrombie as Ambrose, a burrowing owl. This was Abercrombie's final film appearance before his death in 2012.
 Gil Birmingham as Theodore "Wounded Bird" Grank, a Native American crow who becomes Rango's deputy.
 James Ward Byrkit as Waffles, a horned lizard; Gordy, Papa Joad, and Cousin Murt
 Claudia Black as Angelique, a vixen and the mayor's secretary.
 Blake Clark as Buford, a Colorado River toad who is the bartender at Dirt's local saloon.
 John Cothran, Jr. as Elgin, a bobcat whose past is shrouded in mystery.
 Patrika Darbo as Delilah and Maybelle
 George DelHoyo as Señor Flan, the leader of a mariachi band of owls and the narrator of the film.
 Charles Fleischer as Elbows
 Beth Grant as Bonnie
 Ryan Hurst as Jedidiah, Balthazar's son and Ezekiel's older brother.
 Vincent Kartheiser as Ezekiel, Balthazar's son and Jedediah's younger brother. 
 Joseph Nunez as Rock-Eye, a desert rain frog who disguises himself as a rock, until he is snatched by the hawk.
 Hemky Madera as Chorizo, a shrew
 Chris Parson as Hazel Moats, Kinski, Stump, Clinker, Lenny, Boseefus, Dirt Kid
 Lew Temple as Furgus, a bald eagle and Hitch
 Gore Verbinski as Sergeant Turley, a wild turkey; Crevice, Slim, a vulture; and Lupe, a member of the mariachi band of owls.
 Kym Whitley as Melonee, a frog
 Alex Manugian as Spoons, a mouse prospector.
The likeness of Benicio del Toro is briefly used to represent his character of Dr. Gonzo from Fear and Loathing in Las Vegas in a cameo appearance, alongside Johnny Depp as Raoul Duke.

Production
The filming was described as "emotion capture" as the actors shot their scenes in live action for the animators to use as reference. During production, the actors and actresses received costumes and sets in order to "give them the feel of the Wild West"; star Johnny Depp had 20 days in which to voice Rango; and the filmmakers scheduled the supporting actors to interact with him. Verbinski said his attempt with Rango was to do a "small" film after the first three large-scale Pirates of the Caribbean movies, but that he underestimated how painstaking, time-consuming and expensive animated filmmaking is.  Paramount stepped in at the last possible minute as Verbinski's slim financing was about to run out.

Unlike many studio animation projects produced since Avatar, Rango was rendered in 2D, not 3D, as the budget would not allow for it and Verbinski did not want to do a "half-assed 3D."

The film contains a number of references to movie Westerns and other films, including The Shakiest Gun in the West, A Fistful of Dollars, Chinatown, The Good, the Bad and the Ugly, Once Upon a Time in the West, Cat Ballou, Raising Arizona and Fear and Loathing in Las Vegas; as well as references to earlier ILM work including the dogfight in the Death Star trench in Star Wars Episode IV: A New Hope. Verbinski has also cited El Topo as an influence on the film.

In a discussion about the nature of contemporary animated features, Verbinski said in December 2011,

Release

Marketing
Rangos teaser trailer was released on June 9, 2010, alongside the film's official site RangoMovie.com. It depicted an open desert highway and Mr. Timms, Rango’s orange, wind-up plastic fish floating slowly across the road. On June 28, 2010, the first poster was released showing the main character Rango. A two-minute film trailer was released June 29, 2010. Another trailer was released December 14, 2010. A 30-second spot was made specifically to run during Super Bowl XLV on February 6, 2011.

Home media
The film was released on Blu-ray and DVD on July 15, 2011. The release had been produced as a two-disc Blu-ray, DVD, and "Digital Copy" combo pack with both the theatrical and an extended version of the film, cast and crew commentary, deleted scenes, and featurettes.

The extended version adds a final scene in which the flooded town is now a beach resort renamed Mud and Rango rides out to deal with news that Bad Bill is causing trouble elsewhere.

Reception

Box office
Rango earned $123,477,607 in North America and $122,246,996 in other countries for a total $245,724,603. It is the 23rd-highest-grossing film of 2011 worldwide.

In North America, Rango debuted in 3,917 theaters, grossing $9,608,091 on its first day and $38,079,323 during its opening weekend, ranking number one at the box office. Even though the film dropped into second place behind Battle: Los Angeles the following week, it would go on to outgross the weaker opening of Disney's animated flop, Mars Needs Moms. On March 26, 2011, it became the first film of 2011 to cross the $100 million mark in North America.

In markets outside North America, during its first weekend, it earned $16,770,243 in 33 countries. It topped the international box office two times in March 2011. Although the film did not double its budget, it was declared a success by Paramount which subsequently announced the formation of its own animation department.

Critical response
  The critical consensus on Rotten Tomatoes reads, "Rango is a smart, giddily creative burst of beautifully animated entertainment, and Johnny Depp gives a colorful vocal performance as a household pet in an unfamiliar world." Audiences polled by CinemaScore gave the film an average grade of "C+" on an A+ to F scale.

Richard Corliss of Time applauded the "savvy humor" and called the voice actors "flat-out flawless." He later named it one of the 10 best movies of 2011, saying, "In a strong year for animation ... Rango was the coolest, funniest and dagnab-orneriest of the bunch." Bob Mondello of National Public Radio observed that "Rangos not just a kiddie-flick (though it has enough silly slapstick to qualify as a pretty good one). It's a real movie lover's movie, conceived as a Blazing Saddles-like comic commentary on genre that's as back-lot savvy as it is light in the saddle." Frank Lovece of Film Journal International, noting the nervous but improvising hero's resemblance to the Don Knotts character in The Shakiest Gun in the West, echoed this, saying that "with healthy doses of Carlos Castaneda, Sergio Leone, Chuck Jones and Chinatown ... this [is] the kid-movie equivalent of a Quentin Tarantino picture. There's no gory violence or swearing, of course, but there sure is a film buff's parade of great movie moments." Roger Ebert of the Chicago Sun-Times gave the film four out of four stars calling the film "some kind of a miracle: An animated comedy for smart moviegoers, wonderfully made, great to look at, wickedly satirical ... The movie respects the tradition of painstakingly drawn animated classics, and does interesting things with space and perspective with its wild action sequences."

After praising "the brilliance of its visuals," Joe Morgenstern of The Wall Street Journal wrote, "The narrative isn't really dramatic, ... [but] more like a succession of picturesque notions that might have flowed from DreamWorks or Pixar while their story departments were out to lunch."

In one of the more negative reviews, Michael Phillips of the Chicago Tribune acknowledged its "considerable care and craft" but called it "completely soulless" and that watching it "with a big suburban preview audience was instructive. Not much laughter. Moans and sobs of pre-teen fright whenever Rattlesnake Jake slithered into view, threatening murder."

Smoking controversy
The Sacramento, California-based anti-smoking organization Breathe California regards the film a "public health hazard"; it said there were at least 60 instances of smoking in the film. Because of this, some anti-smoking organizations, including Breathe California, petitioned for the film to receive an R rating instead of the original PG rating received by the Motion Picture Association of America. However, no change was made to the smoking scenes and the film maintained its PG rating.

Accolades

Video games

Console games

Electronic Arts released a video game of the same name based on the film. It is rated E10+ and was released for the PlayStation 3, Xbox 360, Nintendo DS, and Wii.

Online games
Funtactix launched Rango: The World, a browser-based virtual world set in the Rango universe, on March 4, 2011, the day of the film's release.

Music

The score was composed by Verbinski's frequent collaborator, Hans Zimmer and features contributions from songwriter and actor Rick Garcia, Latin rock band Los Lobos, and  hardcore punk/industrial band Lard.

Non-original music includes “Finale”, composed by Danny Elfman for the 2007 film The Kingdom, as well as excerpts of Richard Wagner’s “Ride of the Valkyries” and Johann Strauss II’s “The Blue Danube”.

Original songs performed for the film include:

Future
During a Reddit AMA with Verbinski in February 2017, he said that he did not plan on making a sequel to Rango, but he would like to be involved in animation again and to try and come up with an original idea.

See also

 Water conflict
 Desertification

References

External links

 . WebCitation archive. (Archived site's opening page requires clicking on onscreen URL for entry.)
 
 
 
 Rango at Nickelodeon

2011 films
2011 action comedy films
2011 computer-animated films
2010s American animated films
2010s Western (genre) comedy films
2010s children's animated films
American Western (genre) comedy films
American action comedy films
American children's animated comedy films
American computer-animated films
American films with live action and animation
Animated films about animals
Animated films about reptiles
Western (genre) animated films
Best Animated Feature Academy Award winners
Best Animated Feature Annie Award winners
Best Animated Feature BAFTA winners
Best Animated Feature Broadcast Film Critics Association Award winners
Fictional chameleons and geckos
Films about lizards
Films about water scarcity
Film controversies
Films directed by Gore Verbinski
Films produced by Graham King
Films scored by Hans Zimmer
Films set in deserts
Films set in the Las Vegas Valley
Films with screenplays by John Logan
GK Films films
Metafictional works
Nickelodeon Movies films
Nickelodeon animated films
Paramount Pictures animated films
Paramount Pictures films
2010s English-language films